Battle of Woden's Barrow may refer to:

 Battle of Woden's Barrow (592)
 Battle of Woden's Barrow (715)